The Women's Foil event of the 2013 World Combat Games was held  in Saint Petersburg, Russia on 24 October.

Medalists

Athlete List

 Alanna Goldie
 Liu Yongshi
 Carolin Golubytskyi
 Ysaora Thibus
 Astrid Guyart
 Eman Gaber
 Carolina Erba
 Arianna Errigo
 Aida Mohamed
 Edina Knapek
 Jung Gil-ok
 Jeon Hee-sook
 Martyna Synoradzka
 Larisa Korobeynikova
 Inna Deriglazova
 Inès Boubakri

Results

References
Bracket

Fencing at the 2013 World Combat Games
Combat